TS3 may refer to:

 Commer TS3, a diesel engine
 The Sims 3, a 2009 simulation video game
 Toy Story 3, a 2010 American 3D film
 TeamSpeak 3